The 2018 Netball New Zealand Super Club was the second edition of Netball New Zealand's invitational tournament. With a team coached by Yvette McCausland-Durie, captained by Katrina Grant and featuring Karin Burger, Aliyah Dunn, Ameliaranne Ekenasio, Sulu Fitzpatrick and Claire Kersten, Central Pulse finished the tournament as winners after defeating Mainland Tactix 61–56 in the final. All the matches were hosted at the Trafalgar Centre in Nelson between 19 August and 24 August 2018. All the matches were broadcast live on Sky Sport (New Zealand). The tournament also featured two-points for long shots as previously used in Fast5 netball.

Teams
The tournament featured eight teams. These included the top three from the 2018 ANZ Premiership season – Southern Steel, Central Pulse and Mainland Tactix.

Notes
 Marama Vou were a Pacific Islander representative team organised by Netball Fiji and featuring players from Fiji, Samoa and New Zealand. Vicki Wilson was the team's head coach. Frances Solia served as team mentor.

 The New South Wales Institute of Sport team was effectively a combined Netball New South Wales Waratahs and Canberra Giants team.

Group A

Matches
Day 1

Day 2

Day 3

Final ladder

Group B

Matches
Day 1

Day 2

Day 3

Final ladder

5th/8th place classification

Semi-finals

7th/8th place match

5th/6th place match

1st/4th Play offs

Semi-finals

Third place play-off

Final

Final standings

References

2018
2018 in netball
2018 in New Zealand netball
2018 in Australian netball
2018 in Scottish women's sport
2018 in Fijian sport
2018 in Singaporean sport
2018 in South African women's sport
August 2018 sports events in New Zealand